Valençay is an Appellation d'Origine Contrôlée (AOC) for wine in the Loire Valley wine region in France, located in the Touraine subregion. The vineyards of Valençay, a town known for its cheeses, have held AOC status since November 2003. It previously had VDQS status since 1970. They lie on sloping hillsides on the left bank of the river Cher, in south-east Touraine. A range of grape varieties are grown here, but Sauvignon blanc is the main white variety, while Gamay is the main red variety.

References

External links
 www.vins-fromages-valencay.com

Loire AOCs